Woody T. Blackburn (born July 26, 1951) is an American former professional golfer who played on the PGA Tour in the 1970s and 1980s.

Blackburn was born in Pikeville, Kentucky.  He attended the University of Florida in Gainesville, Florida, where he played for coach Buster Bishop's Florida Gators men's golf team from 1972 to 1975.  Blackburn was a member of the Gators' 1973 Southeastern Conference (SEC) championship and NCAA Championship golf team, together with future fellow PGA Tour golfers Phil Hancock, Gary Koch and Andy Bean.  Blackburn was a second-team All-SEC selection and an All-American during the Gators' championship season.  He graduated from Florida with bachelor's degree in journalism in 1973, and turned professional in 1975.

Blackburn's first win after turning pro came in 1976 at the Walt Disney World National Team Championship with playing partner Billy Kratzert.  He had a notably bad run of missing the cut in twenty of twenty-one tournaments and lost his PGA card in 1984, and was forced to requalify for the tour with the rookies.  His second PGA Tour win came at the 1985 Isuzu-Andy Williams San Diego Open.  En route to his first and only individual PGA victory, Blackburn set the 54-hole scoring record at 18-under-par (198), which Tiger Woods tied in 2008.  He also finished in a five-way tie for first at the 1981 Quad Cities Open, but lost in a playoff to Dave Barr.  His best finish in a major was a tie for fortieth at the 1985 PGA Championship.

Blackburn currently lives in Jacksonville, Florida.

Professional wins (2)

PGA Tour wins (2)

PGA Tour playoff record (2–1)

Results in major championships

CUT = missed the half-way cut
"T" = tied

See also

Spring 1976 PGA Tour Qualifying School graduates
1984 PGA Tour Qualifying School graduates
List of Florida Gators men's golfers on the PGA Tour
List of University of Florida alumni

References

External links

American male golfers
Florida Gators men's golfers
PGA Tour golfers
Golfers from Kentucky
Golfers from Jacksonville, Florida
People from Pikeville, Kentucky
1951 births
Living people